Philippine presidents issue executive orders to help officers and agencies of the executive branch manage the operations within the government itself. Listed below are executive orders signed by Philippine President Benigno Aquino III.

2010

2011

2012

2013

2014

2015

2016

References

External links
 

Aquino, Benigno
Presidency of Benigno Aquino III